The 1990 Yugoslavian motorcycle Grand Prix was the seventh round of the 1990 Grand Prix motorcycle racing season. It took place on the weekend of 15–17 June 1990 at the Rijeka circuit.

500 cc race report
In qualifying Christian Sarron went down hard and was heaved roughly off the tarmac by track marshals, which brought complaints from riders that the race organization was unprofessional.

At the start, Wayne Rainey led, followed by Mick Doohan and Niall Mackenzie, while behind them two Cagiva riders collided and crashed: Ron Haslam and Randy Mamola. Haslam touched the back of a bike, and fell off into Mamola.

Kevin Schwantz was in 9th place after either a very bad start or a mechanical problem. The field was getting strung out, Rainey ahead, then Doohan, Mackenzie, Pierfrancesco Chili, and Jean-Philippe Ruggia, with Schwantz in eighth.

Alex Barros crashed and put Cagiva’s Yugoslavian GP to bed.

Schwantz found his rhythm and caught the group of three chasing Rainey: Doohan, Mackenzie and Chili; a small gap to the fight for sixth between Ruggia and Sito Pons.

The gap to Rainey looked too big to close, and the fight for second narrowed down to Mackenzie and Schwantz. Behind him, Doohan led Pons and Chili, but Pons lost the front end on the exit of a right turn, and Chili hit the fallen rider or bike and was thrown into the air. The marshals put Pons on the stretcher like there were snipers in the bleachers, and the question of race organization came to mind again.

250 cc

During the practice Wilco Zeelenberg was hurt.

The rain disturbed the race, which was stopped 2 laps before the end. But the drivers continued due to a bad coordination between marshals, with red flags that did not appear. Darren Milner, who was allowed to fill the empty place left on the grid by Zeelenberg, apparently saw the red flag. He was one lap behind the leaders. Milner slowed to a point he was a moving danger. And in fact Reinhold Roth, going still at full speed, smashed into Milner; also Alex Criville fell to avoid them. As the red flags finally come out the situation worsened, with people and rescuers crossing the track on the site of the shunt with the riders still going at good speed to pit. While Milner and Criville were lifted by rescuers again with unprofessional methods, Reinhold Roth was airlifted in critical state with cerebral injuries and thoracic trauma. Scenes of desperation from the Mobile Clinic were broadcast live on TV, making clear to everyone the heavy consequences of the crash. Reinhold Roth survived the crash but he remained hemiplegic. Carlos Cardus won the race.

500 cc classification

References

Yugoslav motorcycle Grand Prix
Yugoslav
Motorcycle Grand Prix